In mathematics, a general hypergeometric function or Aomoto–Gelfand hypergeometric function is a generalization of the hypergeometric function that was introduced by . The general hypergeometric function is a function that is (more or less) defined on a Grassmannian, and depends on a choice of some complex numbers and signs.

References

 (English translation in collected papers, volume III.)
 Aomoto, K. (1975), "Les équations aux différences linéaires et les intégrales des fonctions multiformes", J. Fac. Sci. Univ. Tokyo, Sect. IA Math. 22, 271-229.

Hypergeometric functions